Edward Phelips (c. 1613 – 5 February 1680) was an English landowner and politician who sat in the House of Commons at various times between 1640 and 1679. He fought for the Royalist cause in the English Civil War.

Biography
Phelips was the son of Sir Robert Phelips of Montacute and his wife Bridget Gorges, daughter  of Sir Thomas Gorges of Longford Castle, Wiltshire. He matriculated at Wadham College, Oxford on 30 October 1629, aged 16.

In 1640, Phelips was elected Member of Parliament for Ilchester  in the Short Parliament. He was re-elected MP for Ilchester for the Long Parliament after a void election in 1640. He was a commissioner of array for the King in 1642 and became a colonel of horse in the Roylist army in 1643. He was governor of Ilchester from 1643 to 1645 and was disabled from sitting in parliament on 5 February 1644. In 1647 he compounded for £1,276.

He was involved to some extent in Charles II's escape from England after the Battle of Worcester, at the point when his brother Robert was trying to arrange passage for Charles aboard a vessel from Southampton. He traveled to Trent Manor to convey news of Robert's activities to Charles on or about 28 September 1651. He may have been with Robert during some of Robert's efforts in and around Southampton.

At the Restoration Phelips was one of those proposed as a Knight of the Royal Oak, having an income of £1,500 p.a. He was appointed  to the Western circuit and became Deputy Lieutenant of Somerset in July 1660, and became commissioner for sewers and commissioner for assessment in August 1660. In 1661, he was elected Member of Parliament for Somerset in the Cavalier Parliament. He became high steward of  Ilchester in the same year and commissioner for corporations in Somerset in 1663. He was defeated at Somerset and lost out in a double return at Ilchester in the general election in 1679. He died on 5 February 1680 at the age of 67 and was buried at Montacute.

Family
Phelips married Anne Pye, daughter of Sir Robert Pye of Faringdon, Berkshire on 21 February 1632. He had four sons of whom Edward was also MP for Ilchester and two daughters. His brother Robert was also an MP.

References

1613 births
1680 deaths
Cavaliers
English MPs 1640 (April)
English MPs 1640–1648
English MPs 1661–1679